Alessandro (Alexandre) Riccitelli (born 6 January 1965) is an Italian former competitive figure skater. He is the 1986 Fujifilm Trophy silver medalist and a seven-time Italian national champion (1984–91). He competed in several European and World Championships in the 1980s and 1990s, in addition to the 1988 Winter Olympics.

Results

References

Italian male single skaters
1965 births
Living people
Olympic figure skaters of Italy
Figure skaters at the 1988 Winter Olympics